GE Hitachi Nuclear Energy (GEH) is a provider of advanced reactors and nuclear services. It is headquartered in Wilmington, North Carolina, United States. Established in June 2007, GEH is a nuclear alliance created by General Electric and Hitachi. In Japan, the alliance is Hitachi-GE Nuclear Energy. In November 2015, Jay Wileman was appointed CEO.

History

In 1955, the Atomic Power Equipment Department was established by GE. Two years later, in 1957: GE's first privately financed nuclear power reactor provides electricity for commercial use in Vallecitos, California. Additionally, in 1960, GE made and contributed to the Dresden Nuclear Power Station in Chicago. In the 1960s, it got involved in constructing and building the Boiling water reactor (BWR). The research into the project continued in the next 50 years resulting in production of 6 different BWR generations. In 1997, the GE-Hitachi U.S. Advanced boiling water reactor (ABWR) design was certified as a final design in final form by the U.S. Nuclear Regulatory Commission.

GE and Hitachi officially established the GE Hitachi Nuclear Energy (GEH) global alliance in 2007 by combining parts of their respective power businesses. Based in Wilmington, North Carolina is creating and supplying BWRs and giving assistance with boiling water and pressurized water reactors. In Canada, the organization was known as GE Hitachi Nuclear Energy Canada and its purpose is to provide fuel and service nuclear power plants that operate on heavy water reactors made by Atomic Energy Canada.  In 2016, GE and Hitatchi sold GE Hitachi Nuclear Energy Canada to BWXT Canada Ltd. and renamed BWXT Nuclear Energy Canada

In 2005, GE Hitachi filed design certification by NRC for their Economic Simplified Boiling Water Reactor (ESBWR). The ESBWR received a positive Safety Evaluation Report and Final Design Approval on March 9, 2011. On June 7, 2011, the NRC completed its public comment period. Final rule was issued on September 16, 2014, after two outstanding problems with GE-Hitachi's modeling of loads on the steam dryer were solved. In 2013, following its purchase of Horizon Nuclear Power, Hitachi began the process of generic design assessment of the Hitachi-GE ABWR with the UK Office for Nuclear Regulation. The process was completed in December 2017. In January 2020, the company started the regulatory licensing process for the BWRX-300 with the U.S. Nuclear Regulatory Commission.

Tennessee Valley Authority (TVA) is undertaking preliminary licensing in collaboration with OPG. SaskPower is considering a deployment, and ORLEN Synthos Green Energy (OSGE) and partners is in pre-licensing in Poland. GEH has memoranda of understanding with companies in Canada, Poland, UK, US, and Sweden, among others, and has begun the licensing process in the UK.

In 2023, the company signed a contract with Ontario Power Generation (OPG), SNC-Lavalin, and Aecon to deploy a BWRX-300 small modular reactor (SMR) at OPG's Darlington New Nuclear Project site, the first contract for a North American grid-scale SMR.

Reactors 
The Advanced Boiling Water Reactor (ABWR) is the world's first operational Generation III Class advanced light water reactor design. The NRC has registered GEH's petition for renewal of ABWR certification.  The Economic Simplified Boiling Water Reactor (ESBWR), the Generation III+ Class design reactor, received a positive final safety evaluation report and final design approval in March 2011, and is expected to receive a license from the NRC by September 2011.

GEH's Power Reactor Innovative Small Modular (PRISM) is a Generation IV reactor that uses liquid sodium as a coolant.  In 2020 GEH partnered with TerraPower to develop a Natrium reactor.

In 2018, GEH agreed to collaborate with Holtec International on the commercialization of the Holtec SMR-160, a 160 MWe pressurized water reactor (PWR) small modular reactor.

Nuclear services
As nuclear plants get older and worldwide demand for energy increases, GEH offers services for adapting plant performance and power output as well as maintenance for extending plant life.

Fuel services
GEH’s fuel cycle business supplies fuel products and services to customers around the world. GE Hitachi Nuclear Energy owns the Morris Operation—the only de facto high-level radioactive waste storage site in the United States.

See also
Horizon Nuclear Power

References

External links 

 Guide to the GE Nuclear Energy Standard Safety Analysis Reports 1994

Engineering companies of the United States
Nuclear technology companies of the United States
Nuclear technology companies of Japan
General Electric subsidiaries
Hitachi
Multinational joint-venture companies
Electronics companies established in 2007